Peter (or Piers) Edgcumbe (1536 – 4 January 1608) of Mount Edgcumbe and of Cotehele in the parish of Calstock, both in Cornwall, was an English Member of Parliament.

Origins
Piers was a traditional first name in his family. He was the eldest son of Sir Richard Edgcumbe (1499–1562), son of Sir Piers Edgcumbe (d.1539) of West Stonehouse and Cotehele, Cornwall.

Career
He was elected a Member of Parliament for Totnes in Devon in 1555, appointed Sheriff of Devon for 1565, Sheriff of Cornwall in 1569 and Custos Rotulorum of Cornwall before 1573–1597. He was also a Member of Parliament for Cornwall in the periods 11 January 1563 – 2 January 1567 and 8 May 1572 – 1581, Devon in 1571, Liskeard in 1584–1585 and was then re-elected for Cornwall in 1586, 1589 and 1593.

He was appointed Lord Lieutenant of Cornwall for the period 8 August 1586 – 7 December 1587 and was appointed Custos Rotulorum of Cornwall in 1587.

Marriage and issue
In about 1555 he married Margaret Luttrell, a daughter of Sir Andrew Luttrell, feudal baron of Dunster, of Dunster Castle in Somerset, by whom he had five sons and four daughters including:
Richard Edgcumbe (d.1639)
Margaret Edgcumbe, who married Sir Edward Denny of Bishops Stortford in Essex. The couple's monument with recumbent effigies survives in Waltham Abbey in Essex.

Death and burial
Piers died in 1608.

References

1536 births
1608 deaths
Members of the Parliament of England (pre-1707) for Totnes
High Sheriffs of Cornwall
High Sheriffs of Devon
Members of the pre-1707 English Parliament for constituencies in Cornwall
English MPs 1563–1567
English MPs 1572–1583
English MPs 1571
English MPs 1584–1585
English MPs 1586–1587
English MPs 1589
English MPs 1593
Lord-Lieutenants of Cornwall
Members of the Parliament of England (pre-1707) for Devon